Rod Waddell (born 23 May 1957) is a former Australian rules footballer who played with Carlton and Geelong in the Victorian Football League (VFL).

Waddell played suburban football for the Lalor Football Club in the Diamond Valley Football League. Because the Collingwood reserves team had fielded him without the proper clearance, it was stripped of four premiership points that it had earned with him in the team in 1981.

After the error was cleared up, Waddell moved to Carlton. Renowned for his quick pace, Waddell played three senior games in late 1981, and two in 1982 before being cleared to Geelong mid-season. He played a further twenty senior games at Geelong between 1982 and 1984, but struggled to hold a regular position there either.

Waddell is the uncle of Daniel, Shannon and Steven Motlop.

Sources

Holmesby, Russell & Main, Jim (2007). The Encyclopedia of AFL Footballers. 7th ed. Melbourne: Bas Publishing.

1957 births
Australian rules footballers from New South Wales
Carlton Football Club players
Geelong Football Club players
Lalor Football Club players
Indigenous Australian players of Australian rules football
Living people